Tamla Motown Gold: The Sound of Young America is a three-disc compilation album released by the Tamla Motown label in 2001. It features all the hits from the label in the 1960s, by various artists.

Track listing

Disc 1
Barrett Strong - Money (That's What I Want)
Smokey Robinson & The Miracles - Shop Around
The Marvelettes - Please Mr. Postman
The Contours - Do You Love Me
The Marvelettes - Beechwood 4-5789
Marvin Gaye - Stubborn Kind Of Fellow
Stevie Wonder - Fingertips
Martha Reeves & The Vandellas - (Love Is Like A) Heatwave
Marvin Gaye - How Sweet It Is (To Be Loved By You)
The Temptations - The Way You Do The Things You Do
Four Tops - Baby I Need Your Loving
The Velvelettes - Needle in a Haystack
Diana Ross & The Supremes - Baby Love
Martha Reeves & The Vandellas - Dancing in the Street
Brenda Holloway - Every Little Bit Hurts
Diana Ross & The Supremes - Where Did Our Love Go?
The Temptations - My Girl
Mary Wells - My Guy
The Velvelettes - He Was Really Sayin' Somethin'
Diana Ross & The Supremes - Come See About Me
Smokey Robinson & The Miracles - The Tracks Of My Tears
Martha Reeves & The Vandellas - Nowhere to Run
Four Tops - I Can't Help Myself (Sugar Pie, Honey Bunch)
Diana Ross & The Supremes - Stop! In the Name of Love
Junior Walker & the Allstars - "Shotgun"
Kim Weston - Take Me In Your Arms (Rock Me a Little While)
Diana Ross & The Supremes - Back in My Arms Again
Smokey Robinson & The Miracles - Going To A Go-Go

Disc 2
Four Tops - It's The Same Old Song
Junior Walker & the Allstars - (I'm a) Road Runner
Diana Ross & The Supremes - I Hear a Symphony
Four Tops - Loving You Is Sweeter Than Ever
The Isley Brothers - This Old Heart of Mine (Is Weak For You)
Marvin Gaye & Kim Weston - It Takes Two
Stevie Wonder - Uptight (Everything's Alright)
The Temptations - Ain't Too Proud To Beg
Four Tops - Reach Out, I'll Be There
Diana Ross & The Supremes - You Can't Hurry Love
The Isley Brothers - I Guess I'll Always Love You
Junior Walker & the Allstars - How Sweet It Is (To Be Loved By You)
Stevie Wonder - A Place in the Sun
The Temptations - Beauty Is Only Skin Deep
Four Tops - Standing in the Shadows of Love
Diana Ross & The Supremes - You Keep Me Hangin' On
The Isley Brothers - Put Yourself In My Place
Jimmy Ruffin - What Becomes of the Broken Hearted
Four Tops - Bernadette
Diana Ross & The Supremes - Love Is Here and Now You're Gone
Gladys Knight & The Pips - I Heard It Through the Grapevine
The Isley Brothers - Behind a Painted Smile
Smokey Robinson & The Miracles - I Second That Emotion
Four Tops - You Keep Running Away
Diana Ross & The Supremes - The Happening
Gladys Knight & The Pips - Take Me in Your Arms and Love Me
The Marvelettes - When You're Young and in Love
Marvin Gaye & Tammi Terrell - Ain't No Mountain High Enough

Disc 3
Four Tops - Walk Away Renée
Diana Ross & The Supremes - Reflections
Jimmy Ruffin - Gonna Give Her All the Love I've Got
Stevie Wonder - I Was Made to Love Her
Martha Reeves & The Vandellas - Jimmy Mack
Four Tops - If I Were a Carpenter
Marvin Gaye & Tammi Terrell - Ain't Nothing Like The Real Thing
Diana Ross & The Supremes - In and Out of Love
The Temptations - Cloud Nine
Stevie Wonder - For Once in My Life
Marvin Gaye - I Heard It Through the Grapevine
Diana Ross & The Supremes with The Temptations - I'm Gonna Make You Love Me
Stevie Wonder - I Don't Know Why I Love You
Marvin Gaye & Tammi Terrell - You're All I Need to Get By
Diana Ross & The Supremes with The Temptations - I Second That Emotion
Edwin Starr - 25 Miles
Diana Ross & The Supremes - Love Child
Stevie Wonder - My Cherie Amour
Marvin Gaye & Tammi Terrell - The Onion Song
Junior Walker & the Allstars - What Does It Take (To Win Your Love)
Diana Ross & The Supremes - Someday We'll Be Together
David Ruffin - My World Ended (The Moment You Left Me)
The Originals - Baby, I'm For Real
Marvin Gaye - Too Busy Thinking About My Baby
Stevie Wonder - Yester-Me, Yester-You, Yesterday
Rare Earth - Get Ready

Charts

Certifications

References

2001 compilation albums
Tamla Records compilation albums
Various artists albums